Veh-Ardashir (also spelled as Beh-Ardashir and Weh-Ardashir), was an ancient Sasanian city in present-day Iraq, and formed a suburb of their capital, Ctesiphon.

History 
Originally known as Seleucia, the city was rebuilt and renamed in 230 by the founder of the Sasanian Empire, king Ardashir I (r. 224-240). The city was known as Mahoza by the Jews, Kokhe (Syriac) by the Christians, and Behrasir by the Arabs. Veh-Ardashir was populated by many wealthy Jews, and was the seat of the church of the Church of the East patriarch.

In the Talmud, it is written as Ardashir, located across the Tigris River from the city of Ctesiphon.

The city was walled and was circular by design.

A governor marzban (general of a frontier province, "margrave") is known to have resided in a fortress in the northern part of this city in ca. 420. During the mid-5th century, a flooding occurred in Veh-Ardashir, which divided the city in two. This resulted in a decline of the city, and the abandonment of many parts of the city. During the reign of king Khosrau II (590-628), a palace was constructed near a garden named Bagh-i Hinduvan (meaning "the garden of the Indians"). In 636, Veh-Ardashir was captured by the Arab general Khalid ibn Urfuta during the Muslim conquest of Persia.

References

Sources
 

 
 
 
 

Sasanian cities
Former populated places in Iraq
Quarters and suburbs of Ctesiphon
Ardashir I